Classic 220 is the second album by the West Coast hip hop group 2nd II None. It was released by Arista Records in 1999.

The album peaked at No. 162 on the Billboard 200.

Production
The album was produced by DJ Quik and 2nd II None.

Critical reception
AllMusic called the album "an intriguing return to form for a hip-hop crew that never made as many records as they should have."

Track listing 

Sample credits
"Back Up off the Wall" contains a sample of "Get Down on It" by Kool & the Gang.
"Y?" contains a sample of "By Your Side" by Con Funk Shun.
"Princess" contains a sample of "Yesterday Princess" by Stanley Clarke.

References

1999 albums
2nd II None albums
Albums produced by DJ Quik
Arista Records albums